Events from the year 1595 in France

Incumbents
 Monarch – Henry IV

Events
8 to 24 April – Siege of Calais
5 June – Battle of Fontaine-Française
20 to 26 June – Siege of Le Catelet
14 to 31 July – Siege of Doullens

Births

Full date missing
Jean Chapelain, poet (died 1674)
Jean Desmarets, writer and dramatist (died 1676)
Claude de Mesmes, comte d'Avaux, diplomat (died 1650)
Henri II de Montmorency, nobleman and military commander (died 1632)
Jean Ballesdens, lawyer and editor (died 1675)

Deaths

Full date missing
André de Brancas, admiral
Henri I d'Orléans, duc de Longueville, aristocrat (born 1568)

See also

References

1590s in France